Henri Miège (born 25 December 1894, date of death unknown) was a Swiss racing cyclist. He rode in the 1921 Tour de France.

References

1894 births
Year of death missing
Swiss male cyclists
Place of birth missing